Karf may refer to:
 Karf-e Olya
 Karf-e Sofla